The 2007 Madrid Masters (also known as the Mutua Madrileña Masters Madrid for sponsorship reasons) was a tennis tournament played on indoor hard courts. It was the 6th edition of the Madrid Masters, and was part of the ATP Masters Series of the 2007 ATP Tour. It took place at the Madrid Arena in Madrid, Spain, from October 15 through October 21, 2007.

The announced field was led by World No. 1, Australian Open, Wimbledon and US Open winner and defending champion Roger Federer, ATP No. 2 and French Open winner Rafael Nadal, and US Open runner-up and Vienna titlist Novak Djokovic. Other top players were US Open semifinalist and Moscow winner Nikolay Davydenko, Australian Open runner up and Beijing titlist Fernando González, James Blake, David Ferrer and Tommy Robredo.

Notable stories

Nalbandian's achievements
David Nalbandian, who prior to the tournament had not reached the semifinal stage of a tournament in the season, suddenly began playing superlative tennis, repeating Novak Djokovic's feat of the Canada Masters, of beating the world's top three players in three consecutive days, with Nalbandian doing it in order of 2 (Rafael Nadal), 3 (Novak Djokovic) and 1 (Roger Federer). The win also marked Nalbandian's first ever Masters Series title, though he had won the Tennis Masters Cup in 2005.

Finals

Singles

 David Nalbandian defeated  Roger Federer 1–6, 6–3, 6–3
It was David Nalbandian's 1st title of the year, and his 6th overall. It was his 1st career Masters title.

Doubles

 Bob Bryan /  Mike Bryan defeated  Mariusz Fyrstenberg /  Marcin Matkowski 6–3, 7–6(7–4)

References

External links
 Official website
 Singles draw
 Doubles draw